Faqir Zehi Morad Bazar (also Romanized as Faqīr Zehī Morād Bāzār) is a village in Polan Rural District, Polan District, Chabahar County, Sistan and Baluchestan Province, Iran. At the 2006 census, its population was 345, in 65 families.

References 

Populated places in Chabahar County